Sambalpur Lok Sabha constituency is one of the 21 Lok Sabha (parliamentary) constituencies in Odisha state in eastern India. This constituency covers the whole Sambalpur district and parts of Deogarh and Angul districts.

Assembly segments
Before delimitation, the legislative assembly segments which constituted this parliamentary constituency were: Padmapur, Melchhamunda, Bijepur, Bhatli, Bargarh, Sambalpur and Rairakhol.

Following delimitation of parliamentary constituencies, this constituency presently comprises the following legislative assembly segments:

Kuchinda and Deogarh assembly segments were earlier in erstwhile Deogarh constituency. Rengali assembly segment came into existence in 2008 following delimitation of legislative assembly constituencies.

Members of Parliament
Elected members from this constituency are:
1952: Natabar Pandey, All India Ganatantra Parishad
1957: Banamali Kumbhar, Ganatantra Parishad / Sradhakar Supakar, Ganatantra Parishad
1962: Kishen Pattanayak, Praja Socialist Party
1967: Shraddhakar Supakar, Indian National Congress
1971: Banamali Babu, Indian National Congress
1977: Gananath Pradhan, Janata Party
1980: Krupasindhu Bhoi, Indian National Congress
1984: Krupasindhu Bhoi, Indian National Congress
1989: Bhabani Shankar Hota, Janata Dal
1991: Krupasindhu Bhoi, Indian National Congress
1996: Krupasindhu Bhoi, Indian National Congress
1998: Prasanna Acharya, Biju Janata Dal
1999: Prasanna Acharya, Biju Janata Dal
2004: Prasanna Acharya, Biju Janata Dal
2009: Amarnath Pradhan, Indian National Congress
2014; Nagendra Pradhan, Biju Janata Dal
2019; Nitesh Ganga Deb, Bharatiya Janata Party

Election Result

General Election 2009

2014 Election Result
In 2014 election, Biju Janata Dal candidate Nagendra Pradhan defeated Bharatiya Janata Party candidate Suresh Pujari by a margin of 30,576 votes.

General election 2019

References

Lok Sabha constituencies in Odisha
Sambalpur district
Angul district
Debagarh district